Paul Peter Vilhelm Breder (10 April 1816–15 January 1890) was a Norwegian civil servant, lawyer, and politician.  He was born in Halden, Norway in 1816 and died in Drammen in 1890.

From 1854 to 1858 he was County Governor of Nordlands amt.  He was elected to the Norwegian Parliament in 1857, representing Nordland county from 1857 to 1858.   In 1858, he was named the County Governor of Buskeruds amt, a position that he held until 1882.  After that he became a customs official based out of Drammen.

References

1816 births
1890 deaths
Members of the Storting
County governors of Norway
County governors of Nordland
Nordland politicians
People from Halden